Tom John Ward, actor/writer in Please Like Me
Tony J. White, a key developer of the ETPub mod for Wolfenstein: Enemy Territory that contributed an administrative system and a backported client for Tremulous that were incorporated into the official Subversion (software) repository